Erling Brandsnes (20 March 1945 – 16 February 2022) was a Norwegian politician for the Labour Party.

Biography
Brandsnes was born in Folldal, Reichskommissariat Norwegen, on 20 March 1945. He served as a deputy representative to the Norwegian Parliament from Hedmark during the terms 1993–1997 and 1997–2001. From 2000 to 2001 he was a regular representative, covering for Sylvia Brustad who was appointed to the first cabinet Stoltenberg. He was mayor of Folldal municipality council from 1987 to 1999. In the period 1983–1987 he was a member of Hedmark county council. Prior to being a full time politician, he worked as a teacher. Brandsnes died on 16 February 2022, at the age of 76.

References

External links
 

1945 births
2022 deaths
20th-century Norwegian politicians
21st-century Norwegian politicians
People from Folldal
Labour Party (Norway) politicians
Mayors of places in Hedmark
Members of the Storting